Gurdawara Bair Sahib also called Baba Beri or Baba Bair is situated in Sialkot, Pakistan. It was the place where Baba Guru Nanak stayed and met Hamza Ghaus, a famous saint of Sialkot. The berry tree under which Guru Nanak stayed is still present. The gurdwara was built by Natha Singh and it includes a garden, a pool and residential rooms. The gurdwara was renovated during the 2010s and opened for pilgrims.

Gallery

See also
 Sialkot

References

Gurdwaras in Pakistan
Buildings and structures in Sialkot